The Japanese Elm cultivar Ulmus davidiana var. japonica 'Reperta' was a University of Wisconsin–Madison selection (no. 43–2) named and registered in Germany by Conrad-Appel, Darmstadt, in 1993.

Description
Not available.

Pests and diseases
'Reperta' has only a moderate resistance to Dutch elm disease.

Cultivation
'Reperta' never entered commerce in North America or Europe owing to its only marginal resistance to DED. A specimen grown at the Botanischer Garten Marburg , Marburg, Germany, obtained in 1993, died while still a young plant, apparently unable to tolerate the local climate.

Accessions
None.

References

Japanese elm cultivar
Ulmus articles missing images
Ulmus